WEZI (102.9 MHz "Easy 102.9") is a commercial FM radio station in Jacksonville, Florida.  It airs an adult contemporary radio format and is owned by Atlanta-based Cox Media Group.

The station's studios and offices are located on Belfort Parkway in Jacksonville's Southside district.  The transmitter is off Hogan Road in the Arlington neighborhood.  WEZI is a Class C FM station, running at an effective radiated power (ERP) of 100,000 watts, from a tower at 1,014 feet (309 m) in height above average terrain (HAAT).  Its signal stretches from the Georgia coast to south of St. Augustine, Florida to southwest as far as Gainesville, Florida.

History

WIVY-FM
On November 1, 1965, the station signed on as WIVY-FM.  At first, it ran at 28,900 watts, less than a third of its current power.  It was the sister station to AM 1050 WIVY, which was a daytimer, so the FM station allowed WIVY's programming to be heard around the clock.  Both stations were owned by New York announcer Ed Bell Oberle.  The following year the stations were sold to Alumni Radio, Inc.

In 1971, the stations were acquired by another New York announcer, Tom Kirby, under the name Jacksonville Broadcasting.  He saw FM stations in other cities starting rock formats so he hired a staff of young disc jockeys and switched both stations to album-oriented rock (AOR). (The AM station moved to 1280 kHz, but remained a daytime-only operation, simulcasting WIVY-FM.)

Kirby sold WIVY-FM in 1976 to Torrid Broadcasting, a subsidiary of Progressive Communications.  It flipped to Top 40 hits as "Y-103".  In 1985, Gilmore Broadcasting bought the station, boosting the power to 100,000 watts, helping WIVY-FM better cover the expanding Jacksonville radio market.  In 1988, J.J. Taylor Communications took over the station, moving the format a bit older to hot adult contemporary music, but still as Y-103.

WMXQ
In 1998, Capstar purchased the station.  It kept the Hot AC format but changed its call sign to WMXQ, with the station also rebranding as "Mix 103."  Capstar sold WMXQ to Cox Radio in 2000.  Cox switched the format to all-1980s music on November 1, 2000, calling the station "102.9 The Point".

WXXJ
On February 25, 2009, at 5:55 a.m., Cox flipped WMXQ to alternative rock as "X102.9."  The last song on "The Point" was "Don't You (Forget About Me)" by Simple Minds (bookending the format, as it was the first song that launched "The Point").  The first song on "X" was "Chop Suey!" by System of a Down. The station was launched to compete with heritage modern rock station WPLA (now mainstream rock WWJK).  The WXXJ call letters were adopted on April 7, 2009.

As WXXJ rose in the ratings, it began an offensive against its format rival.  The station flew a banner over Metropolitan Park during the last Planetfest and interfered with WPLA's annual "Easter Keg Hunt" by bribing people with $300 for the kegs.  WPLA management called police to stop the activity.  On August 4, 2010, WPLA ended its alternative rock format, switching to classic hits, leaving WXXJ as the only modern rock station in Jacksonville until 2019.

WEZI
On November 20, 2017, WXXJ swapped formats and frequencies with sister station WEZI (106.5 FM), adopting that station's soft adult contemporary format and re-branded as "Easy 102.9".  At first, "Easy" played all Christmas music, but on December 26, 2017, the Soft AC format resumed on 102.9 FM.  The two stations swapped call signs on November 26, 2017.

Over time, WEZI has evolved into a more mainstream adult contemporary format, phasing in more current songs and re-focusing on adult contemporary hits from the 1980s, 1990s, 2000s and 2010s.

References

External links

EZI (FM)
Mainstream adult contemporary radio stations in the United States
Cox Media Group
Radio stations established in 1965
1965 establishments in Florida